Two-time defending champion Serena Williams defeated Caroline Wozniacki in the final, 6–3, 6–3 to win the women's singles tennis title at the 2014 US Open. It was her Open Era-record-equaling sixth US Open singles title and 18th major singles title overall, equaling Martina Navratilova and Chris Evert's tally. She did not lose a set during the tournament for a record-equaling third time, and did not lose more than three games in any set.

The top three seeds (Williams, Simona Halep and Petra Kvitová) were in contention for the world No. 1 ranking. Williams retained the top position after Halep and Kvitová lost in the third round.

This was the first major main draw appearance for CiCi Bellis, who at the age of 15 became the youngest player to win a match at the US Open since 1996.

Seeds

Qualifying

Draw

Finals

Top half

Section 1

Section 2

Section 3

Section 4

Bottom half

Section 5

Section 6

Section 7

Section 8

Championship match statistics

References

External links
 Main draw
 Qualifying draw
2014 US Open – Women's draws and results at the International Tennis Federation

Women's Singles
US Open
US Open (tennis) by year – Women's singles
2014 in women's tennis
2014 in American women's sports